Hāʻena is an unincorporated community and census-designated place on the island of Kauai in Kauai County, Hawaii, United States. Its population was 550 as of the 2020 census. The community is located on the north side of the island along Hawaii Route 560.

Geography

References

Populated places on Kauai
Unincorporated communities in Kauai County, Hawaii
Unincorporated communities in Hawaii
Census-designated places in Kauai County, Hawaii
Populated coastal places in Hawaii